Julio César Baldivieso Rico (born 2 December 1971) is a Bolivian football coach and former player who played as an attacking midfielder.

Baldivieso was a midfielder who played for the Bolivia national team at the 1994 World Cup and several Copa Américas.

Football career

Club
Nicknamed "El Emperador", Baldivieso began his career in his native Cochabamba playing for Wilstermann in 1987. His exquisite technique didn't go unnoticed and he signed with Bolivia's biggest football club, Bolívar in 1992. Thanks in part to the successful run with the national team, which qualified to the 1994 World Cup, he awoke the interest of several clubs outside Bolivia. After the World Cup, he transferred to Argentine team Newell's Old Boys from Rosario, where he played until the winter of 97. Subsequently, he joined J1 League club Yokohama Marinos for a couple of years. As his career progressed, Baldivieso also exposed his talent in diverse leagues around the world; such is the case of Barcelona Sporting Club and Deportivo Quevedo in Ecuador, Cobreloa in Chile, Al-Nasr in Saudi Arabia, Al-Wakra in Qatar and Caracas in Venezuela. Towards the end of his career he returned to Bolivia and played for The Strongest, and later made his final run with Aurora on and off the field as he also managed the team.

Throughout his career, Baldivieso also played in 46 Copa Libertadores games altogether for three different teams and scored 11 goals.

International
Baldivieso made his debut for Bolivia on 14 June 1991 in a friendly match, losing 1–0 against Paraguay in Santa Cruz de la Sierra. He obtained a total number of 85 caps during his career, scoring fifteen goals. He played his last international match on 12 October 2005: a World Cup Qualifier against Peru in Tacna.

Managerial
During his last season as a player Baldivieso transitioned into coaching as he took over the manager position at the club. In November 2008 he won the Clausura tournament with Aurora in a very disputed 3-game final series against Blooming. On 19 July 2009, still being Aurora's manager, he made debut his own 12-year-old son, called Mauricio Baldivieso. At the end of the match he strongly criticized the referee and one opponent who made his son cry after a hard tackle. He quit Aurora 5 days later, after the club's board told him to pick between his job and his son. He also withdrew his son from the team. On 20 May 2011 Baldivieso returned to Aurora for his second spell. Later in his career he also managed Real Potosí, Nacional Potosí, San José, Wilstermann and Universitario de Sucre. On 28 August 2015 Baldivieso was officially presented as the manager for the Bolivia national team.

In late 2017, he became the first Bolivian to coach a foreign national football team from outside the Americas, when he was appointed as coach of Palestine. He was released in April 2018 due to a series of controversies related between him and Saudi officials.

On 31 January 2019, Baldivieso was appointed as the manager of Club Always Ready. On 23 September 2019, Baldi returned to Aurora as a sporting advisor because he couldn't appear as a coach in the official matches, after he already led Club Always Ready in the current 2019 Bolivian Primera División season and, according to the rules, a head coach cannot lead to two clubs in the same contest. He announced in December 2019, that he would leave the club because it wasn't the same for him to lead from the stands. However, later on the same month, it was confirmed that Francisco Argüello, who had been Baldi's assistant coach during the last 4–5 years, had taken charge of Aurora and that Baldi would continue at the club as his assistant, now where he couldn't lead the team officially.

Statistics career

National team

International goals

Managerial statistics

Personal
His son Mauricio Baldivieso is the youngest player to have played in a professional football match.

References

External links
 

 RSSSF statistics
 Profile at BoliviaGol.com 

1971 births
Living people
Sportspeople from Cochabamba
Association football midfielders
Bolivian footballers
Bolivia international footballers
C.D. Jorge Wilstermann players
Club Bolívar players
Newell's Old Boys footballers
Yokohama F. Marinos players
Barcelona S.C. footballers
Cobreloa footballers
Al Nassr FC players
Club Aurora players
Al-Wakrah SC players
Caracas FC players
C.D. Quevedo footballers
The Strongest players
Bolivian Primera División players
Argentine Primera División players
Chilean Primera División players
Ecuadorian Serie A players
J1 League players
Qatar Stars League players
Venezuelan Primera División players
1994 FIFA World Cup players
1991 Copa América players
1993 Copa América players
1995 Copa América players
1997 Copa América players
2001 Copa América players
Bolivian expatriate footballers
Expatriate footballers in Argentina
Expatriate footballers in Japan
Expatriate footballers in Ecuador
Expatriate footballers in Chile
Expatriate footballers in Qatar
Expatriate footballers in Saudi Arabia
Expatriate footballers in Venezuela
Bolivian expatriate sportspeople in Chile
Bolivian expatriate sportspeople in Argentina
Bolivian expatriate sportspeople in Ecuador
Bolivian expatriate sportspeople in Japan
Bolivian expatriate sportspeople in Saudi Arabia
Bolivian expatriate sportspeople in Venezuela
Bolivian expatriate sportspeople in Qatar
Bolivian football managers
Bolivian expatriate football managers
Bolivian expatriate sportspeople in the State of Palestine
Expatriate football managers in the State of Palestine
Club Aurora managers
Club Real Potosí managers
Nacional Potosí managers
C.D. Jorge Wilstermann managers
Club Always Ready managers
Bolivia national football team managers
Carabobo F.C. managers
Palestine national football team managers
Copa América Centenario managers
Saudi Professional League players
C.D. Palmaflor del Trópico managers
Royal Pari F.C. managers
Universitario de Sucre managers